Ryce is a surname variant of the Welsh name Rhys.

People with the name include:

 Claudine Dianne Ryce (1942–2009), missing children's advocate, mother of Samuel James Ryce
 Griffith Ryce (1478–1521), Welsh nobleman
 Mark Ryce, guitarist of The Big Dish (band)
 Samuel James Ryce (1985–1996), son of Claudine Dianne Ryce, victim of killer Juan Carlos Chavez 
 Joel Ryce-Menuhin (1933–1988), American pianist
 Jamal Campbell-Ryce (born 1983), British soccer player

See also

 Rhyce Shaw (born 1981) Australian rules football player
 
 Reece (disambiguation)
 Reese (disambiguation)
 Rees (disambiguation)
 Rhees (disambiguation)
 Reis (disambiguation)
 Rice (disambiguation)
 Rise (disambiguation)
 Ryse (disambiguation)
 Rys (disambiguation)